Azumi can be either a Japanese given name or surname.

People
, Japanese politician
, Japanese voice actor
 (fl. 1980s to present), a Japanese manga artist
, Japanese football player
, Japanese voice actress
, Japanese retired wrestler 
, a Japanese singer
, a Japanese pin-up model
, a former J-pop singer
, a member of the Japanese two-piece group Wyolica
, a Japanese voice actress

Fictional characters
 Azumi, the titular character of the manga and film series Azumi
 Hime Azumi, a character in the manga Tokyo Mew Mew
 Azumi Hidaka, a character in the Mirmo! manga series
 Azumi Yamada, a character in Hen
 Azumi, a character in the tokusatsu Kamen Rider Blade, human guise of the Serpent Undead
 Yūsuke Azumi, character from Fireworks, Should We See It from the Side or the Bottom?

Japanese feminine given names
Japanese-language surnames